Melick en Herkenbosch is a former municipality in the Dutch province of Limburg. It covered the villages of Melick and Herkenbosch.

In 1991, the municipality merged with Vlodrop, and in 1993, it changed its name to Roerdalen.

References

Municipalities of the Netherlands disestablished in 1993
Former municipalities of Limburg (Netherlands)
Roerdalen